A list of the most notable films produced in Bulgaria during the first decade of the 21st century ordered by year of release. For an alphabetical list of articles on Bulgarian films, see :Category:Bulgarian films.

List

2000

2001

2002

2003

2004

2005

2006

2007

2008

2009

References
 
 
 The Internet movie database

2000s
Films
Bulgaria